8½ Intercuts: Life and Films of K.G. George is an Indian documentary film produced in Malayalam about K.G. George, one of the leading directors of Indian cinema. The film was screened in 2017th International Film Festival of Goa and selected for non-feature section of Indian panorama. The film was directed by Lijin Jose and Shibu G. Suseelan produced the film.

References

External links 
 
 Film on K.G. George a big draw at SiGNS film festival
 Documentary on K G George!
 Documenting a cine legend
 A Documentary That Explores The Master's Genius & Demons
 പനോരമയിൽ താരമാകാൻ
 കെ.ജി. ജോർജിന് സമർപ്പണവുമായി ലിജിൻ
 ഇന്ത്യൻ പനോരമയിൽ-1
 ഇന്ത്യൻ പനോരമയിൽ-2
 ലൈഫ് ആൻഡ് ഫിലിംസ് ഓഫ് കെ.ജി.ജോർജ് ഇന്നു പ്രദർശിപ്പിക്കും

Indian documentary films